Dolný Pial is a village and municipality in the Levice District in the Nitra Region of Slovakia.

History
In historical records the village was first mentioned in 1470.

Geography
The village lies at an altitude of 182 metres and covers an area of 13.989 km². It has a population of 995 people.

Ethnicity
The village is approximately 95% Slovak and 4% Magyar and 1% Czech.

Facilities
The village has a public library, a gym, and a football pitch.

Genealogical resources
The records for genealogical research are available at the state archive "Statny Archiv in Nitra, Slovakia"
 Roman Catholic church records (births/marriages/deaths): 1725-1895 (parish A)
 Reformated church records (births/marriages/deaths): 1784-1895 (parish B)

See also
 List of municipalities and towns in Slovakia

External links
 
 
https://web.archive.org/web/20071116010355/http://www.statistics.sk/mosmis/eng/run.html
Surnames of living people in Dolny Pial

Villages and municipalities in Levice District